This article lists events that occurred during 1940 in Estonia.

Incumbents
First Secretary of the Communist Party of Estonia Karl Säre

Events
17 June – The Red Army occupied Estonia and Latvia.
21 July – New Estonian Parliament (loyal to Soviet powers) proclaimed Estonian SSR.
6 August – Estonia was unlawfully declared the Estonian SSR and was, against the law, incorporated into the Soviet Union.

Births
19 February – Jaan Kiivit Jr., Estonian clergyman
30 April – Ülo Õun, sculptor (died 1988)

Deaths

References

 
1940s in Estonia
Estonia
Estonia
Years of the 20th century in Estonia